This is a list of law enforcement agencies in the state of Mississippi.

According to the US Bureau of Justice Statistics' 2008 Census of State and Local Law Enforcement Agencies, the state had 342 law enforcement agencies employing 7,707 sworn police officers, about 262 for each 100,000 residents. Per the state constitution, all "civil officers" of the state, including those in the legislative and judicial branches, can exercise the power of arrest, though this is rarely exercised by said officials.

State agencies 
 Mississippi Attorney General's Office
 Mississippi Bureau of Investigation
 Mississippi Bureau of Narcotics
 Mississippi Capitol Police
 Mississippi Department of Corrections
 Mississippi Department of Revenue
Criminal Investigations Division
Alcoholic Beverage Control
 Mississippi Department of Wildlife, Fisheries and Parks
 Law Enforcement Division
 Mississippi Highway Patrol
 Mississippi Department of Transportation Office of Law Enforcement
 Mississippi Reservoir Police
 Mississippi Gaming Commission
   Mississippi Agricultural & Livestock Theft Bureau
 Mississippi Department of Human Services | Office of Inspector General | Bureau of Investigation

School district agencies 
 North Bolivar Consolidated Schools School Safety
 Hazlehurst City School District Safety and Security Department
 Hattiesburg Public Schools Police Department
 Petal School Police Department
 Biloxi School District Police Department
 Jackson Public Schools Campus Enforcement Department
 Ocean Springs School District Police Department
 Meridian Public School District Police Department
 North Panola School District Bullying/School Safety Department
 Pearl River County School District Police Department
 Greenville Public School District Campus Safety Department
 Leland School District Police Department
 George County School District Police Department
 Lawrence County School District Police Department
 Tishomingo County School District Police Department
 Vicksburg-Warren School District Campus Police Department

County agencies 

 Adams County Sheriff's Office 
 Alcorn County Sheriff's Office
 Amite County Sheriff's Office 
 Attala County Sheriff's Office 
 Benton County Sheriff's Office
 Bolivar County Sheriff's Office
 Calhoun County Sheriff's Office 
 Carroll County Sheriff's Office 
 Chickasaw County Sheriff's Office 
 Choctaw County Sheriff's Office
 Claiborne County Sheriff's Office
 Clarke County Sheriff's Office
 Clay County Sheriff's Office
 Coahoma County Sheriff's Office
 Copiah County Sheriff's Office
 Covington County Sheriff's Office
 De Soto County Sheriff's Office
 Forrest County Sheriff's Office
 Franklin County Sheriff's Office
 George County Sheriff's Office
 Greene County Sheriff's Office
 Grenada County Sheriff's Office
 Hancock County Sheriff's Office
 Harrison County Sheriff's Department
 Hinds County Sheriff's Office
 Holmes County Sheriff's Office
 Humphreys County Sheriff's Office
 Issaquena County Sheriff's Office

 Itawamba County Sheriff's Office
 Jackson County Sheriff's Office
 Jasper County Sheriff's Office
 Jefferson County Sheriff's Office
 Jefferson Davis County Sheriff's Office
 Jones County Sheriff's Office
 Kemper County Sheriff's Office
 Lafayette County Sheriff's Office
 Lamar County Sheriff's Office
 Lauderdale County Sheriff's Office
 Lawrence County Sheriff's Office
 Leake County Sheriff's Office
 Lee County Sheriff's Office
 Leflore County Sheriff's Office
 Lincoln County Sheriff's Office
 Lowndes County Sheriff's Office
 Madison County Sheriff's Office
 Marion County Sheriff's Office
 Marshall County Sheriff's Office
 Monroe County Sheriff's Office
 Montgomery County Sheriff's Office
 Neshoba County Sheriff's Office
 Newton County Sheriff's Office
 Noxubee County Sheriff's Office
 Oktibbeha County Sheriff's Office
 Panola County Sheriff's Office
 Pearl River County Sheriff's Office

 Perry County Sheriff's Office
 Pike County Sheriff's Office
 Pontotoc County Sheriff's Office
 Prentiss County Sheriff's Office
 Quitman County Sheriff's Office
 Rankin County Sheriff's Department
 Scott County Sheriff's Office
 Sharkey County Sheriff's Office
 Simpson County Sheriff's Office
 Smith County Sheriff's Office
 Stone County Sheriff's Office
 Sunflower County Sheriff's Office
 Tallahatchie County Sheriff's Office
 Tate County Sheriff's Office
 Tippah County Sheriff's Office
 Tishomingo County Sheriff's Office
 Tunica County Sheriff's Office
 Union County Sheriff's Office
 Walthall County Sheriff's Office
 Warren County Sheriff's Office
 Washington County Sheriff's Office
 Wayne County Sheriff's Office
 Webster County Sheriff's Office
 Wilkinson County Sheriff's Office
 Winston County Sheriff's Office
 Yalobusha County Sheriff's Office
 Yazoo County Sheriff's Office

City agencies 
 Aberdeen Police Department
 Ackerman Police Department
 Amory Police Department
 Ashland Police Department
 Baldwyn Police Department
 Bassfield Police Department
 Batesville Police Department
 Bay Saint Louis Police Department
 Bay Springs Police Department
 Belmont Police Department
 Belzoni Police Department
 Biloxi Police Department
 Booneville Police Department
 Brandon Police Department
 Brookhaven Police Department
 Bruce Police Department
 Bude Police Department
 Burnsville Police Department
 Byhalia Police Department
 Byram Police Department
 Calhoun City Police Department
 Canton Police Department
 Carthage Police Department
 Centreville Police Department
 Charleston Police Department
 Clarksdale Police Department
 Cleveland Police Department
 Clinton Police Department
 Coffeeville Police Department
 Coldwater Police Department
 Collins Police Department
 Columbia Police Department
 Columbus Police Department
 Como Police Department
 Corinth Police Department
 Crenshaw Police Department
 Crystal Springs Police Department
 Decatur Police Department
 Dekalb Police Department
 Drew Police Department
 Durant Police Department
 Edwards Police Department
 Ellisville Police Department
 Eupora Police Department
 Fayette Police Department
 Flora Police Department
 Florence Police Department
 Flowood Police Department
 Forest Police Department
 Friars Point Police Department
 Fulton Police Department
 Gautier Police Department
 Gloster Police Department
 Golden Police Department
 Goodman Police Department
 Greenville Police Department
 Greenwood Police Department
 Grenada Police Department
 Gulfport Police Department
 Guntown Police Department
 Hattiesburg Police Department
 Hazlehurst Police Department
 Heidelberg Police Department
 Hernando Police Department
 Hollandale Police Department
 Holly Springs Police Department
 Horn Lake Police Department
 Houston Police Department
 Indianola Police Department
 Inverness Police Department
 Itta Bena Police Department
 Iuka Police Department
 Jackson Police Department
 Jonestown Police Department
 Kilmichael Police Department
 Kosciusko Police Department
 Laurel Police Department
 Leakesville Police Department
 Leland Police Department
 Lena Police Department
 Lexington Police Department
 Liberty Police Department
 Long Beach Police Department
 Louisville Police Department
 Lucedale Police Department
 Lumberton Police Department
 Macon Police Department
 Madison Police Department
 Magee Police Department
 Magnolia Police Department
 Marion Police Department
 Marks Police Department
 McComb Police Department
 Mendenhall Police Department
 Meridian Police Department
 Monticello Police Department
 Moorhead Police Department
 Morton Police Department
 Moss Point Police Department
 Mound Bayou Police Department
 Mount Olive Police Department
 Natchez Police Department
 Nettleton Police Department
 New Albany Police Department
 Newton Police Department
 Oakland Police Department
 Ocean Springs Police Department
 Okolona Police Department
 Olive Branch Police Department
 Oxford Police Department
 Pascagoula Police Department
 Pass Christian Police Department
 Pearl Police Department
 Pelahatchie Police Department
 Petal Police Department
 Philadelphia Police Department
 Picayune Police Department
 Pickens Police Department
 Pine Belt Police Department
 Pontotoc Police Department
 Poplarville Police Department
 Port Gibson Police Department
 Prentiss Police Department
 Purvis Police Department
 Quitman Police Department
 Raleigh Police Department
 Raymond Police Department
 Richland Police Department
 Richton Police Department
 Ridgeland Police Department
 Ripley Police Department
 Rolling Fork Police Department
 Rosedale Police Department
 Ruleville Police Department
 Saltillo Police Department
 Sardis Police Department
 Scooba Police Department
 Senatobia Police Department
 Shannon Police Department
 Shaw Police Department
 Shelby Police Department
 Sherman Police Department
 Soso Police Department
 Smithville Police Department
 Southaven Police Department
 Starkville Police Department
 Stonewall Police Department
 Summit Police Department
 Sumrall Police Department
 Sunflower Police Department
 Taylorsville Police Department
 Tchula Police Department
 Tupelo Police Department
 Tutwiler Police Department
 Tylertown Police Department
 Union Police Department
 University Police Department
 Vaiden Police Department
 Vicksburg Police Department
 Walls Police Department
 Walnut Police Department
 Walnut Grove Police Department
 Water Valley Police Department
 Waveland Police Department
 Waynesboro Police Department
 Wesson Police Department
 West Point Police Department
 Wiggins Police Department
 Winona Police Department
 Woodville Police Department
 Yazoo City Police Department

College and university agencies 

 Alcorn State University Police Department
 Jackson State University Police Department
 Mississippi State University Police Department
 University of Mississippi Medical Center Police Department

 University of Mississippi Police Department
 University of Southern Mississippi Police Department
 Mississippi Gulf Coast Community College Campus Police Department

Other agencies 

 Jackson Airport Authority Police Department

 Tupelo Airport Authority Police Department

 Federal Bureau of Investigation

References

Mississippi
Law enforcement agencies of Mississippi
Law enforcement agencies